Yuat may refer to:

Papua New Guinea
one of the Yuat languages of Papua New Guinea
one of the Upper Yuat languages of Papua New Guinea
the Yuat River
Yuat Rural LLG in East Sepik Province, Papua New Guinea

Australia
the Yuat people of Australia
the Yuat language (Australia)